Derrick George Johnson Mullins (born July 28, 1989) is a Costa Rican professional footballer who currently plays as a defender for Costa Rican Primera Division side Limón.

Club career
Before signing with Limón in 2011, Johnson had considered signing with Guatemalan side Comunicaciones and Major League Soccer. He moved to Herediano in 2012 and would play 23 league matches for them.

In summer 2013, Herediano sent him on loan to Uruguay de Coronado but in August 2013 Johnson left Herediano himself to join second division Siquirreña.

References

1989 births
Living people
People from Limón Province
Association football defenders
Costa Rican footballers
C.S. Herediano footballers
2009 CONCACAF U-20 Championship players